Macroschisma sinense is a species of sea snail, a marine gastropod mollusk in the family Fissurellidae, the keyhole limpets and slit limpets.

Distribution
This species occurs in the following locations:
 Red Sea

References

 Okutani T., ed. (2000) Marine mollusks in Japan. Tokai University Press. 1173 pp.

External links
 To Encyclopedia of Life
 To World Register of Marine Species

sinense
Gastropods described in 1855